Humbert Pugliese (1884–1955) was an Australian film exhibitor and producer. A chain of cinemas had been established by his father Antonio and wife Caroline and Humbert became general manager when his father died in 1916. His chain was often supportive of Australian films and Humbert produced three features.

Humbert Pugliese became involved in family’s theatrical enterprises in 1906 when his parents took control of Sydney’s Alhambra Theatre. During the next 15 years he helped oversee the production of a wide array of entertainments at the theatre, including waxworks exhibits, vaudeville shows, revues, dramas, musical comedies, pantomimes and films. The 1910s also saw Pugliese and his mother produce three early Australian films, while also managing the operations of at cinemas in Bondi and Leichhardt. He later became the proprietor of the shoe store chain Mabs McGuirk.

Film credits
The Church and the Woman (1917) - producer
The Waybacks (1918) - producer
Struck Oil (1919) - producer

References

External links

Humbert Pugliese at National Film and Sound Archive

Australian film producers
1955 deaths
1884 births